William Dalrymple (born William Hamilton-Dalrymple on 20 March 1965) is a Delhi-based Scottish historian and art historian, as well as a curator, photographer, broadcaster and critic. He is also one of the co-founders and co-directors of the world's largest writers festival, the annual Jaipur Literature Festival.

His books have won numerous awards and prizes, including the Wolfson Prize for History, the Duff Cooper Memorial Prize, the Hemingway, the Kapuściński, the Arthur Ross Medal of the US Council on Foreign Relations, the Thomas Cook Travel Book Award and the Sunday Times Young British Writer of the Year Award. He has been five times longlisted and once shortlisted for the Baillie Gifford Prize for non-fiction and was a Finalist for the Cundill Prize for History. The BBC television documentary on his pilgrimage to the source of the river Ganges, 'Shiva's Matted Locks', one of three episodes of his Indian Journeys series, which Dalrymple wrote and presented, won him the Grierson Award for Best Documentary Series at BAFTA in 2002.

In 2018, he was awarded the President's Medal of the British Academy, the Academy’s highest honour in its suite of prizes and medals awarded for "outstanding service to the cause of the humanities and social sciences."

Dalrymple was the curator of Princes and Painters in Mughal Delhi 1707–1857, a major show of the late Mughal painting for the Asia Society in New York, which ran from February to May 2012. A catalogue of this exhibit co-edited by Dalrymple with Yuthika Sharma was published by Penguin in 2012 under the same name. More recently he curated the exhibition of Company style painting, Forgotten Masters: Indian Painting for the East India Company, at the Wallace Collection in London.

In 2012, Dalrymple was appointed a Whitney J. Oates Visiting Fellow in the Humanities by Princeton University. In 2015, he was appointed the OP Jindal Distinguished Lecturer at Brown University. He is also since 2021 an Honorary Fellow of the Bodleian Library and will soon take up a position as Visiting Fellow at All Souls College, Oxford University He was named in the 2020 Prospect list of the top 50 thinkers for the COVID-19 era.

Personal life
Dalrymple is the son of Sir Hew Hamilton-Dalrymple, 10th Baronet of North Berwick and Lady Anne-Louise Keppel, a daughter of the Walter Keppel, 9th Earl of Albemarle; through this line of descent, he is the third cousin of Queen Camilla, both being great-great-grandchildren of William Keppel, 7th Earl of Albemarle. He is a great nephew  of Virginia Woolf. His brother, Jock, was a first-class cricketer. He was educated at Ampleforth College and Trinity College, Cambridge, where he was first a history exhibitioner and then a senior history scholar.

Dalrymple first went to Delhi on 26 January 1984, and has lived in India on and off since 1989 and spends most of the year at his Mehrauli farmhouse in the outskirts of Delhi, but summers in London and Edinburgh. His wife, Olivia, is an artist and comes from a family with long-standing connections to India. The couple have three children. Through his wife's side of the family, he is related to Scottish actress Rose Leslie.

Interests and influence

Dalrymple's interests include the history and art of India, Pakistan, Afghanistan, the Middle East, Hinduism, Buddhism, the Jains and early Eastern Christianity. Every one of his ten books have won literary prizes. His first three were travel books based on his journeys in the Middle East, India and Central Asia. His early influences included travel writers such as Robert Byron, Eric Newby, and Bruce Chatwin.

Dalrymple published a book of essays about current affairs in the Indian subcontinent, and four award-winning histories of the  interaction between the East India Company and the peoples of India and Afghanistan between the eighteenth and mid-nineteenth century, his "Company Quartet". His books have been translated into more than 40 languages.

He is a regular contributor to The New York Review of Books, The Guardian, the New Statesman and The New Yorker. He has also written many articles for Time magazine. He was the Indian Subcontinent correspondent of the New Statesman from 2004-2014.

He attended the inaugural Palestine Festival of Literature in 2008 – giving readings and taking workshops in Jerusalem, Ramallah and Bethlehem.

His 2009 book, Nine Lives: In Search of the Sacred in Modern India, a study of some of the more esoteric forms of modern Indian, and especially Hindu, spirituality, was published by Bloomsbury, and like all his others, went to the number one slot on the Indian non-fiction best-seller list. Since its publication he has been touring the UK, India, Pakistan, Bangladesh, Australia, Holland and the US with a band consisting of some of the people featured in his book including Sufis, Fakirs, Bauls, Theveram hymn singers as well as a prison warder and part-time Theyyam dancer widely believed to incarnate the God Vishnu.

Return of a King: The Battle for Afghanistan, a history of the First Afghan War 1839–42, was published in India in December 2012, in the UK in February 2013, and in the US in April 2013. Dalrymple's great-great-granduncle Colin Mackenzie fought in the war and was briefly detained by the Afghans. Following the publication of the book Dalrymple was called to brief both the Afghan President Hamid Karzai and the White House on the lessons to be learned from Afghan history.

His most recent book, published in 2019, is The Anarchy, a history of the Indian Subcontinent during the period from 1739 to 1803, which saw the collapse of the Mughal imperial system, rise of the Maratha imperial confederacy, and the militarisation and rise of power of the East India Company. It was long listed for the Baillie Gifford Prize 2019, and short listed for the Duke of Wellington medal for Military History, the Tata Book of the Year (Non-fiction) and the Historical Writers Association Book Award 2020. It was a Finalist for the Cundill Prize for History and won the 2020 Arthur Ross Bronze Medal from the US Council on Foreign Relations.

TV and radio
Dalrymple has written and presented the six-part television series Stones of the Raj (Channel 4, August 1997), the three-part Indian Journeys (BBC, August 2002) and Sufi Soul (Channel 4, Nov 2005).

The six-part Stones of the Raj documents the stories behind some of British India's colonial architecture starting with Lahore (16 August 1997), Calcutta (23 August 1997), The French Connection (30 August 1997), The Fatal Friendship (6 September 1997), Surrey in Tibet (13 September 1997), and concluded with The Magnificent Ruin (20 September 1997).

The trilogy of Indian Journeys consists of three one-hour episodes starting with Shiva’s Matted Locks which while tracing the source of the Ganga, takes Dalrymple on a journey to the Himalayas. The second part, City of Djinns, is based on his travel book of the same name, takes a look at Delhi's history, and last Doubting Thomas, which takes Dalrymple to the Indian states of Kerala and Tamil Nadu, where St Thomas, the Apostle of Jesus is closely associated.

He has done a six-part history series The Long Search for Radio 4. In this series Dalrymple searches to discover the spiritual roots of the British Isles. Dalrymple says "In the course of my travels I often came across the assumption that intense spirituality was somehow the preserve of what many call 'the mystic East'... it's a misconception that has always irritated me as I've always regarded our own indigenous British traditions of spirituality as especially rich."

The BBC broadcast a documentary on 3 September 2015 entitled Love and Betrayal in India: The White Mughal, based on Dalrymple's book White Mughals.

Dalrymple was the historical consultant to ITV's 2019 series Beecham House.

In 2022, Dalrymple teamed up with journalist Anita Anand to create the podcast Empire, the first series of which examines the British East India Company and British involvement and influence on India. The pair had previously collaborated on the book Koh-i-Noor: The History of the World's Most Infamous Diamond. The Podcast went straight to No.1 in the UK Apple Podcast charts, had over five million downloads in its first six months and was nominated for UK Podcast of the Year in the Broadcasting Press Guild Audio Awards.

Bibliography

Books 
 
City of Djinns: A Year in Delhi (1994)
From the Holy Mountain: A Journey in the Shadow of Byzantium (1997)
The Age of Kali (1998)
White Mughals (2002)
The Last Mughal, The Fall of a Dynasty, Delhi 1857 (2006)
Nine Lives: In Search of the Sacred in Modern India. London, Bloomsbury. (2009) 
Return of a King: The Battle for Afghanistan (2012) 
The Writer’s Eye (2016) Harper Collins India  
Koh-i-Noor: The History of the World's Most Infamous Diamond (2017) 
The Anarchy: The Relentless Rise of the East India Company (2019) 

Editor 
Lonely Planet Sacred India. Lonely Planet Publications, (1999) 
Begums, Thugs & White Mughals: The Journals of Fanny Parkes (2002)
Princes and Painters in Mughal Delhi 1707–1857. Penguin Books India, (2012) 
Forgotten Masters: Indian Painting for the East India Company. Philip Wilson Publishers, (2020)

Essays and reporting 
 
———————
Notes

Awards and honours
 In Xanadu received the 1990 Yorkshire Post Best First Work Award and the Scottish Arts Council Spring Book Award.
 City of Djinns received the 1994 Thomas Cook Travel Book Award and the Sunday Times Young British Writer of the Year Award.
 From the Holy Mountain received the 1997 Scottish Arts Council Autumn Book Award.
 The Age of Kali (1998) won the 2005 French Prix d'Astrolabe.
 White Mughals: Love & Betrayal in Eighteenth-Century India (2002) won the 2001 Wolfson Prize for History.
 Dalrymple was awarded the Mungo Park Medal in 2002 by the Royal Scottish Geographical Society for his outstanding contribution to travel literature.
 The television series Stones of the Raj and Indian Journeys, which Dalrymple wrote and presented, won him the Grierson Award for Best Documentary Series at BAFTA in 2002.
 The Long Search, Dalrymple's BBC Radio 4 series on the history of British spirituality and mysticism, won the 2002 Sandford St Martin Prize for Religious Broadcasting and was described by the judges as "thrilling in its brilliance...near perfect radio."
 White Mughals: Love & Betrayal in Eighteenth-Century India (2002) won the 2003 Scottish Book of the Year Prize.
 Dalrymple's article on madrasas of Pakistan was awarded the prize for Best Print Article of the Year at the 2005 FPA Media Awards.
 The Sykes Medal in 2005 from the Royal Society for Asian Affairs for his contribution "to understanding (of) contemporary Islam."
 An Honorary Doctorate of Letters, Honoris Causa, from the University of St. Andrews in 2006 "for his services to literature and international relations, to broadcasting and understanding."
 The Last Mughal won the Duff Cooper Memorial Prize for History and Biography in February 2007.
 Dalrymple received an Honorary Doctorate of Letters, Honoris Causa, from the University of Lucknow in 2007 "for his outstanding contribution in literature and history."
 The Last Mughal won the 2007 Vodafone Crossword Book Award for best work in English non-fiction.
 An Honorary Doctorate of Letters, Honoris Causa, from the University of Aberdeen (2008).
 The 2008 Colonel James Tod Award given by the Maharana Mewar Foundation for achieving excellence in his field.
 Nine Lives received the 2010 Asia House Award for Asian Literature.
 The Media Citizen Puraskar by the Indian Confederation of NGOs for emphasising as an author issues of global importance and concern.
 Honorary Doctorate from the University of Bradford for his contributions to creative writing, literature and the Indian Subcontinent history fields (2012).
 Honorary Doctorate of Letters from the University of Edinburgh.
 The 2015 Hemingway Prize for Return of a King.
 The 2015 Kapuściński Prize for Return of a King.
Elected a Corresponding Fellow of the Royal Society of Edinburgh.
Elected a Fellow of the Royal Asiatic Society.
 He was awarded the President's Medal of the British Academy "for his literary achievements and for co-founding Jaipur Literary Festival".
 He was awarded the 2022 Minerva Medal of the Royal Philosophical Society of Glasgow for his contribution to the writing of history. 
 Elected a Fellow of the Royal Historical Society.

References

External links

 William Dalrymple's Home Page
Islamophobia Article by William Dalrymple

1965 births
21st-century Scottish historians
Alumni of Trinity College, Cambridge
British expatriates in India
Historians of India
Indian travel writers
Living people
Fellows of the Royal Asiatic Society
Fellows of the Royal Society of Literature
Historians of colonialism
People educated at Ampleforth College
20th-century Scottish historians
Scottish Roman Catholics
Scottish travel writers
Fellows of the Royal Geographical Society
Recipients of the President's Medal (British Academy)
Younger sons of baronets
Brown University faculty
The New Yorker people